Mohammed Nasif Kheirbek (10 April 1937 – 28 June 2015) known as Mohammed Nasif or Abu Wael, was the former Deputy Vice-President for Security Affairs in Syria. He was a close adviser of Syrian President Bashar Assad and is Syria's point-man for its relationship with Iran and Lebanon's Shia militias. He is one of a number of officials that were sanctioned by the European Union for the use of violence against the civilian population during the Syrian civil war.

Background
Mohammed Nasif Kheirbek was born 10 April 1937 in Homs but was from the Alawite village of al-Laqbah near Masyaf. He was a member of the Alawi Kalabiya tribe, to which Bashar Assad belongs. The Kheirbek and Assad family are also connected by marriage. His brother Mu'ein is married to one of Rifaat al-Assad's daughters, Tumadhir. Mohammed was the head of the powerful Kheirbek clan who are represented throughout the Ba'ath Party and the Syrian security apparatuses.

Career
Kheirbek was a very close adviser to the late Syrian President Hafez al-Assad. He was the military attache in East Germany between 1971 and 1975. In the 1990s he was a central figure in relations with Iran and Lebanese Shiite militias. In 1999, he was appointed as the deputy director of the General Security Directorate and then in 2005 became the deputy vice-president for security affairs. Two years later, the US froze his assets for contributing to the government of Syria's problematic behavior, which included support of international terrorism, the pursuit of weapons of mass destruction, and the undermining of efforts in Iraq. He was also reported in 2007 to be in charge of Syria's Lebanon portfolio.

Syrian Civil War
In May 2011, Kheirbek was sanctioned by the European Union for the use of violence against protesters participating in the Syrian civil war. The following month, he reportedly traveled to Iran to meet General Qasem Soleimani, the commander of the Quds Force, a division of the Iranian Islamic Revolutionary Guard Corps (IRGC), which conducts special operations outside Iran. They reportedly discussed creating a supply route that would allow Iran to transfer military equipment directly to Syria by way of a new military compound at Latakia airport.

Personal life
Kheirbek got married at an old age and had an only son called Wael.

References

Assad family
1937 births
2015 deaths
People of the Syrian civil war
Syrian Alawites
Syrian generals
Arab_Socialist_Ba%27ath_Party_–_Syria_Region_politicians
Syrian individuals subject to U.S. Department of the Treasury sanctions
Syrian individuals subject to the European Union sanctions
Sanctioned due to Syrian civil war